Watson is a city in Desha County, Arkansas, United States. The population was 211 at the 2010 census.

Delta Heritage Trail
In 1992, the Union Pacific Railroad discontinued service on a rail line which ran directly through Watson, and a  right-of-way on which the rail line ran was donated to the State of Arkansas. Parts of the abandoned rail line have since been converted into the Delta Heritage Trail. The portion of the trail passing through Watson is still under construction.  A wilderness lies to the north of the town, where the trail will have views of the Arkansas River (from the Yancopin Bridge), and of the White River (from the Benzal Bridge). Between the bridges, the trail is planned to traverse old-growth hardwood forest within the Trusten Holder State Wildlife Management Area.

Geography

Demographics

2020 census

As of the 2020 United States census, there were 185 people, 115 households, and 68 families residing in the city.

2000 census
As of the census of 2000, there were 288 people, 113 households, and 78 families residing in the city. The racial makeup of the city was 72.57% White, 24.65% Black or African American, 0.69% Native American, 0.69% Pacific Islander, and 1.39% from two or more races.

There were 113 households, out of which 25.7% had children under the age of 18 living with them, 48.7% were married couples living together, 12.4% had a female householder with no husband present, and 30.1% were non-families. 28.3% of all households were made up of individuals, and 17.7% had someone living alone who was 65 years of age or older.  The average household size was 2.55 and the average family size was 3.10.

In the city, the population was spread out, with 24.0% under the age of 18, 7.3% from 18 to 24, 19.8% from 25 to 44, 26.0% from 45 to 64, and 22.9% who were 65 years of age or older.  The median age was 44 years. For every 100 females, there were 94.6 males.  For every 100 females age 18 and over, there were 87.2 males.

The median income for a household in the city was $17,143, and the median income for a family was $33,889. Males had a median income of $30,625 versus $15,313 for females. The per capita income for the city was $13,631.  About 22.6% of families and 25.8% of the population were below the poverty line, including 40.5% of those under the age of eighteen and 23.0% of those 65 or over.

Education
It is in the McGehee School District.

In 1972 the Watson School District merged into the Delta Special School District. On July 1, 2004, the Delta Special School District merged into the McGehee district.

References

External links
 Trusten Holder State Wildlife Management Area

Cities in Desha County, Arkansas
Cities in Arkansas